The Music...The Mem'ries...The Magic! is the ninth live album by American singer Barbra Streisand, recorded during the concert tour of the same name. Released by Columbia Records on December 8, 2017, the album sold 11,000 units in its first week in the United States (nearly all from traditional album sales). The Music...The Mem'ries...The Magic! received a nomination for Best Traditional Pop Vocal Album at the 61st Annual Grammy Awards.

Track listing

Charts

References

External links
Barbra Archives: The Music ... The Mem’ries ... The Magic! (2017)

2017 live albums
Barbra Streisand live albums
Columbia Records live albums